The Catalina 28 is an American sailboat, that was designed by Gerry Douglas and first built in 1991.

Production
The boat was built by Catalina Yachts in the United States, in two versions, but it is now out of production. The first version, The Catalina 28, was produced from 1991–1995, with 620 examples completed. The Mk II was produced from 1995-2010.

Design
The Catalina 28 is a small recreational keelboat, built predominantly of fiberglass. It has a masthead sloop rig, an internally-mounted spade-type rudder and a fixed fin keel.

Variants
Catalina 28
This model  was designed by Gerry Douglas and introduced in 1991, with 620 examples completed. The wing keel version displaces  and carries  of iron ballast. The boat is fitted with a Universal M3-20 diesel engine. The boat has a PHRF racing average handicap of 201 with a high of 210 and low of 195. A tall mast version was available with a mast approximately  higher. The tall mast version has a PHRF racing average handicap of 192 with a high of 200 and low of 186.

Catalina 28 Mk II
This model was also designed by Gerry Douglas, introduced in 1995 and produced until 2010. The improvements include  a widened aft hull, giving a larger aft cabin and a redesigned galley, plus an improvement of the basic sail control arrangements. The wing keel version displaces  and carries  of iron ballast. The boat is fitted with a Universal 25XPBC diesel engine. The boat has a PHRF racing average handicap of 198 with a high of 205 and low of 192.

See also
List of sailing boat types

Similar sailboats
Aloha 28
Beneteau First 285
Beneteau Oceanis 281
Bristol Channel Cutter
Cal 28
Cumulus 28
Grampian 28
Hunter 28
Hunter 28.5
Hunter 280
J/28
Laser 28
O'Day 28
Pearson 28
Sabre 28
Sea Sprite 27
Sirius 28
Tanzer 8.5
Tanzer 28
TES 28 Magnam
Viking 28

References

External links

Keelboats
1980s sailboat type designs
Sailing yachts
Sailboat types built by Catalina Yachts
Sailboat type designs by Gerry Douglas